The Canadian province of Newfoundland and Labrador is composed of mainland Labrador and the large island of Newfoundland. The coast of both the island and the Labrador Peninsula are lined with islands of various magnitudes.

List

Natural bays
 
 
 
Spread Eagle Bay
Ste. Genevieve Bay
St. Mein Bay

See also

Geography of Newfoundland and Labrador

References

External links

Bell Island Mining History

Newfoundland and Labrador
Islands